Hershberger is a surname. Notable people with the surname include:

Guy Hershberger (1896–1989), American Mennonite theologian, educator, historian and writer
John Hershberger (born 1959), American computer scientist
Mike Hershberger (1939–2012), American baseball player
Natalie Hershberger (born 2004), American taekwondo practitioner and writer
Pete Hershberger (born 1949), American politician
Sally Hershberger (born 1961) American hair stylist
Willard Hershberger (1910–1940), American baseball player

See also
Hershberger Mountain Lookout
Hershberg